William J. Volok (March 23, 1910 - August 6, 1991) was a professional American football player who played guard and tackle for six seasons for the Chicago Cardinals.

Volok was 6'2, and, during his six seasons of play time, was 216lbs. He was known to have pep talks with his teammates, often occurring at half time. He attended Lucas High in Kansas.

Volok died in Drumright, Oklahoma, at the age of 81.

1910 births
1991 deaths
American football guards
American football tackles
Tulsa Golden Hurricane football players
Chicago Cardinals players